Late Night Tales: Trentemøller is a mix album compiled by Danish electronic music producer Trentemøller, released on 30 May 2011 as part of the Late Night Tales series.

The mix features tracks from artists such as Velvet Underground & Nico, M. Ward, The Black Angels (band), Low and We Fell to Earth. Paul Morley contributes the spoken word piece, "Lost For Words Pt. 1". Trentemøller also produced an exclusive cover version of Chris Isaak's "Blue Hotel".

Track listing

References

External links
 Official Trentemøller website
 Official Late Night Tales: Trentemøller Page

2011 compilation albums
Trentemoller
Trentemøller albums